The Kenton Times is a daily newspaper founded and based in Hardin County, Ohio. The Times is the second paper to operate in Ada, Ohio alongside the Ada Herald.

Ownership

The Kenton Times is the consolidation of the Kenton Daily Democrat and the Kenton News and Republican. The two papers merged in 1953 when Ray Barnes purchased the Daily Democrat from C. E. Flanagan and the News and Republican from Edwin S. Rutledge. In November 1953, The Kenton Times began publishing from the former plant of the Daily Democrat.

The Kenton Times is currently owned and operated by Ray Barnes INC.

Staff

The news editor is Tim Thomas, who also serves as a reporter along with Joel McCullough. Sean Blevins serves as sports editor. Richard Katterjohn serves as production manager.

References

External links
Kenton Times-Official Site
Kenton Times-Twitter

Newspapers published in Ohio
1953 establishments in Ohio